The 1954 New York Yankees season was the team's 52nd season. Having won an unprecedented fifth consecutive World Series title the previous year, the team came up short in its bid for a sixth straight world championship as their 103-51 record was only good enough for in second place in the American League. New York finished eight games behind the Cleveland Indians, who broke the Yankees' 1927 AL record by winning 111 games. New York was managed by Casey Stengel. The Yankees played their home games at Yankee Stadium.

Offseason 
 November 19, 1953: Ralph Terry was signed as an amateur free agent by the New York Yankees.

Regular season 
Bob Grim became the first rookie pitcher to win 20 games in one season but pitch less than 200 innings in the same season.

Season standings

Record vs. opponents

Notable transactions 
 April 11, 1954: Bill Virdon, Mel Wright, and Emil Tellinger (minors) were traded by the Yankees to the St. Louis Cardinals for Enos Slaughter.
 May 11, 1954: Jim Brideweser was traded by the Yankees to the Baltimore Orioles for Neil Berry, Dick Kokos and Jim Post (minors).

Roster

Player stats

Batting

Starters by position 
Note: Pos = Position; G = Games played; AB = At bats; H = Hits; Avg. = Batting average; HR = Home runs; RBI = Runs batted in

Other batters 
Note: G = Games played; AB = At bats; H = Hits; Avg. = Batting average; HR = Home runs; RBI = Runs batted in

Pitching

Starting pitchers 
Note: G = Games pitched; IP = Innings pitched; W = Wins; L = Losses; ERA = Earned run average; SO = Strikeouts

Other pitchers 
Note: G = Games pitched; IP = Innings pitched; W = Wins; L = Losses; ERA = Earned run average; SO = Strikeouts

Relief pitchers 
Note: G = Games pitched; W = Wins; L = Losses; SV = Saves; ERA = Earned run average; SO = Strikeouts

Awards and honors 
 Yogi Berra, American League MVP
All-Star Game

Farm system 

LEAGUE CHAMPIONS: Quincy, Modesto

Notes

References 
1954 New York Yankees at Baseball Reference
1954 New York Yankees at Baseball Almanac

New York Yankees seasons
New York Yankees season
New York Yankees
1950s in the Bronx